Mat, Matt, Mathew or Matthew Beard may refer to:

Mathew Beard (1870–1985), American longevity claimant
Mat Beard, American state legislator from 1931 to 1937 (16th Oklahoma Legislature)  
Matthew "Stymie" Beard (1925–1981), American child actor in Our Gang
Matt Beard (born 1978), English football manager for Bristol City W.F.C.
Matthew Beard (English actor) (born 1989)